John H. Hellweg (December 4, 1844 – July 28, 1931) was an American businessman and politician.

Hellweg was born in Keokuk County, Iowa and went to the public schools. During the American Civil War, he served in the 35th Iowa Volunteer Infantry Regiment. Hellweg went to the Central Wesleyan College in Warrenton, Missouri. Hellweg was the president of the Hayward Mercantile Company in Hayward, Wisconsin and was also an agent for a timber business. He served as a correspondent for the Chicago Tribune and was involved with the Grand Army of the Republic. Hellweg served on the Sawyer County Boaord of Supervisors. In 1919 and 1920, Hellweg served in the Wisconsin Assembly and was a Republican. Hellweg died at his son's home in Blue Island, Illinois where he had gone to recuperate from a heart attack that he had suffered from.

Notes

External links

1844 births
1931 deaths
People from Keokuk County, Iowa
People from Hayward, Wisconsin
People of Iowa in the American Civil War
Central Wesleyan College (Missouri) alumni
Businesspeople from Wisconsin
Journalists from Wisconsin
Chicago Tribune people
County supervisors in Wisconsin
Republican Party members of the Wisconsin State Assembly